Lavaveix-les-Mines is a commune in the Creuse department in the Nouvelle-Aquitaine region in central France.

Geography

Population

Sights
 The nineteenth-century church.
 Remnants of the nineteenth-century coalmines.

See also
Communes of the Creuse department

References

Communes of Creuse